Robert Longmire (born 26 November 1944) is a former Australian rules footballer who played with Collingwood in the Victorian Football League (VFL).

Longmire is the uncle of former North Melbourne Football Club player John Longmire.

Notes

External links 

1944 births
Australian rules footballers from New South Wales
Collingwood Football Club players
Corowa Football Club players
Living people